Kruti Dev (Devanagari: कृतिदेव) is  Devanagari typeface and non-Unicode clip font typeface which uses the keyboard layout of Remington's typewriters. In north Indian states many public service commissions conduct their clerk, stenographer, data entry operator's typing exams using the Kruti Dev typeface. Historically, familiarity with Remington's typewriters could facilitate learning to type on a computer using this font as they use a similar keyboard. It was released nearly in 1997 and designed by Kruti Dev Ram.

References

Devanagari typefaces
Indic computing
Clip fonts
Typefaces